Philipp Ludescher (born 3 January 1987 in Feldkirch) is an Austrian former professional racing cyclist.

Major results

2003
 1st  Road race, National Youth Road Championships
 1st  Youth race, National Cyclo-cross Championships

External links

Austrian male cyclists
1987 births
Living people
People from Feldkirch, Vorarlberg
Sportspeople from Vorarlberg
21st-century Austrian people